Hollins is a census-designated place and unincorporated community in Clay County, Alabama, United States. Its population was 517 as of the 2020 census.

History
Hollins is named after an official who worked for the Kaul Lumber Company.  Hollins began when the Columbus and Western Railway reached the area in the late 1800s. In 1888, John Kaul bought out the Sample Lumber Company in Hollins and founded the Kaul Lumber Company. The large demand for lumber led to an increase in lumber jobs in Hollins. In addition to the Kaul Lumber headquarters and mill, Hollins was home to a hotel, several general stores, three churches, a school, and a cotton gin. Hollins was incorporated on February 21, 1893. In 1908, the Kaul Lumber mill burned and was rebuilt. In 1911, the mill was closed and was moved to Kaulton. The population began to decline, and Hollins' town charter was dissolved on September 25, 1919.  A post office began operation under the name Hollins in 1887.

In 1890 and 1900, Hollins was the second largest community in Clay County after Ashland, the county seat. It reached its zenith of 688 persons in 1910 before its dissolution in 1919, but had fallen behind Lineville in importance to third place. With its recognition as a census-designated place in 2010, it has resumed its third-place position.

Demographics

References

External links
 Pictures of sawmill and Kaul Lumber Company operations at Hollins

Census-designated places in Clay County, Alabama
Census-designated places in Alabama